José Ituarte may refer to:

Joseba Ituarte (born 1970), Spanish professional footballer
José Moscardó Ituarte (1878 – 1956), Spanish military Governor of Toledo Province during the Spanish Civil War
José Luis Ituarte, Spanish racing driver